Barry John Rowlings (born 21 August 1950) is a former Australian rules footballer who played for the Hawthorn Football Club and the Richmond Football Club in the Victorian Football League (VFL). He is one of few players to have played in League premierships at two clubs.

Playing career
He was one of Hawthorn's best players in the emotional 1976 premiership triumph.

In 1978 Rowlings suffered a serious knee injury which prevented him from being part of Hawthorn's 1978 triumph, and was cleared to Richmond. In his first season at Tigerland won the Jack Dyer Medal, which is awarded to Richmond's best and fairest player for the season.

After Playing Career
Since 1996 Rowlings has been involved with the football program at Caulfield Grammar School and Caulfield Grammarians Football Club, and holds a football ambassador and development coaching role for all year levels.

Rowlings has been partly responsible for the football development of many current AFL players, such as Brent Hartigan, Jason Winderlich, Chris Judd, Tristan Cartledge, Matthew Richardson, and Tom Roach.

Further reading
 Hogan P: The Tigers of Old, Richmond FC, Melbourne 1996

See also
 List of Caulfield Grammar School people

References

External links

 

Living people
Hawthorn Football Club players
Hawthorn Football Club Premiership players
Richmond Football Club players
Richmond Football Club Premiership players
Jack Dyer Medal winners
Australian rules footballers from Victoria (Australia)
Moe Football Club players
1950 births
Victorian State of Origin players
Two-time VFL/AFL Premiership players